Team Rytger powered by Cykeltøj-Online.dk is a cycling team based in Denmark. In 2015 it was registered as a UCI Women's Team, enabling it to compete in elite road bicycle racing events such as the UCI Women's Road World Cup, but returned to the Danish national ranks from 2016.

Major results
2018
Nootdorp, Clara Lundmark
Stage 3 Watersley Ladies Tour, Julia Borgström
Youth Olympic Games – Team Time Trial, Mie Saabye

National champions

2010
 Denmark Road Race, Annika Langvad
 Denmark Time Trial, Annika Langvad

2011
 Denmark Time Trial, Annika Langvad

2013
 Denmark Road Race, Kamilla Sofie Vallin

2014
 Netherlands Track (Madison), Kelly Markus

2016
 Denmark Road Race, Emma Norsgaard Jørgensen

2017
 Denmark Junior Time Trial, Emma Norsgaard Jørgensen

2018
 Denmark Junior Cyclo-cross, Mie Saabye
 Sweden Junior Time Trial, Julia Borgström
 Sweden Junior Road Race, Julia Borgström
 Denmark Junior Time Trial, Mie Saabye
 Denmark Junior Road Race, Mie Saabye

References

External links

Cycling teams based in Denmark
UCI Women's Teams
Cycling teams established in 2014